The 1988 Southland Conference men's basketball tournament was held March 8–10, 1988 with quarterfinal matchups being held at the home arena of the higher seed and the semifinals and championship game played at UNT Coliseum in Denton, Texas.

North Texas State defeated  in the championship game, 87–70, to win their first Southland men's basketball tournament.

The Mean Green received a bid to the 1988 NCAA Tournament as No. 15 seed in the West region. They were the only Southland member invited to the tournament.

Format 
Six of eight of the conference's members participated in the tournament field. They were seeded based on regular season conference records, with the top two seeds earning byes into the semifinal round. New conference members  and  did not participate. The other four teams began play in the quarterfinal round.

First round games were played at the home court of the higher-seeded team. All remaining games were played at UNT Coliseum in Denton, Texas.

Bracket

References 

Southland Conference men's basketball tournament
Tournament
Southland Conference men's basketball tournament
Southland Conference men's basketball tournament
Basketball competitions in Texas
Sports in Denton, Texas
College sports tournaments in Texas